The Parazoom Trio-Star Delta is a German ultralight trike, bicycle and powered parachute, designed and produced by Parazoom of Rheine. The aircraft is supplied as a complete ready-to-fly-aircraft.

Design and development
It features a Bautek Pico cable-braced hang glider-style high-wing, weight-shift controls, a single-seat open cockpit without a cockpit fairing, adjustable tricycle landing gear and a single engine in pusher configuration. It can also be equipped with a paraglider wing or ridden as a bicycle, with the appropriate options fitted.

The aircraft is made from welded steel tubing, in its "Delta" configuration it is fitting with a double surface hang glider wing covered in Dacron sailcloth. The  span wing is supported by a single tube-type kingpost and uses an "A" frame weight-shift control bar. The powerplant is a V twin-cylinder, air-cooled, four-stroke  Briggs & Stratton Vanguard engine. The landing gear has an adjustable track width, depending on the application and wing used.

Specifications (version)

References

External links

2000s German sport aircraft
2000s German ultralight aircraft
Single-engined pusher aircraft
Powered parachutes
Ultralight trikes